The year 1819 in archaeology involved some significant events.

Explorations

Excavations
 The remains of the villa of Pliny, named Villa di Pino, are excavated during 1802–1819 (following the excavations of 1713).
 In Italy, detailed excavations continue at Pompeii.
 The Bignor Roman Villa is excavated between 1811 and 1819.

Finds
 April - In India, the Ajanta Caves are rediscovered by a British hunting party.
 Roman villa found at Stancombe Park near North Nibley, England.

Publications

Other events
 In Italy, sexual, nude artifacts from Pompeii are hidden from public view in Naples' Secret Museum.
 In Italy, John Gardner Wilkinson meets the antiquarian Sir William Gell and resolves to study Egyptology.
 King Francis I of Naples visits the Pompeii exhibition at the National Museum with his wife and daughter.
 June 16 – The 7.7–8.2  Rann of Kutch earthquake shakes western India with a maximum Mercalli intensity of XI (Extreme), leaving more than 1,500 dead.

Births
 March 28 – Roger Fenton, photographer (d. 1869)

Deaths
 June 29 – Samuel Lysons, English antiquarian (b. 1763)

References

Archaeology
Archaeology by year
Archaeology
Archaeology